Corrèze may refer to:

Places

 Corrèze, a department in the center of France, named after:
 the Corrèze (river)
 Corrèze, Corrèze, a commune of the Corrèze department

People

 Jacques Corrèze